/() is a South Korean-Japanese manhwa series created by Youn In-wan and illustrated by Yang Kyung-il. The story takes place in a world reminiscent of ancient Korea, and follows the Korean-folktale-inspired adventures of Munsu, one of the few remaining guardians against corruption and tyranny, as he seeks to find those responsible for the destruction of his country. It was serialized from 2001 to 2007 in South Korea (as Shin amhaengosa) and in Japan (as Shin Angyō Onshi), and was adapted into an anime theatrical-release film in 2004 in a first-of-its-kind collaboration between Japan and South Korea. In 2007, an English-language version of the film was released in the United States by ADV Films (licensed for $130,000) under the title Blade of the Phantom Master. In 2008, the anime became one of over 30 ADV titles transferred to Funimation.

Plot
Blade of the Phantom Master takes place in the fictional land of Jushin, modeled after feudal Korea. In Jushin, there once lived secret government agents called the amheng osa (or angyō onshi in the Japanese version), who traveled the countryside in disguise. They were charged by the king with finding and punishing corrupt government officials, and bringing justice to the country's citizens.

At the start of the series, Jushin has been destroyed, fractured into numerous fiefdoms and kingdoms, many of which are ruled by corrupt and tyrannical warlords. Blade of the Phantom Master follows the adventures of one of the remaining amheng osa, Munsu, as he continues to wander the countryside and deals with the chaos caused by Jushin's fall.

Though initially episodic in nature, it becomes apparent as the series progresses that Munsu's travels are not random. In truth, Munsu is searching for the man responsible for assassinating his best friend, the king of Jushin, an act that led to the fall of the country.

But as Munsu grows closer to reaching his goal, he encounters old friends and comrades from his past, some who have since switched their allegiance to his enemy. Through them, it is revealed that Munsu was not always an amheng osa and is himself partly responsible for the king's death and subsequent fall of Jushin.

In addition to the overarching plotline, the series also uses the exploits of Munsu and his companions to retell various Korean folk stories.

Amheng Osa
In Blade of the Phantom Master, amheng osa bear bronze medallions, given to them by the king and emblazoned with between one and three horses. The greater the number of horses, the higher the rank of the amheng osa. Amheng osa of first mahai rank have one horse emblazoned onto their medallions, which allows them to wield basic magic to fight ordinary soldiers. The most powerful medallions feature three horses, and allow the bearers, third mahai (三馬牌), to perform summonings and regenerate injuries.

Despite being made for use by amheng osa, the mahai medallions will also work for normal people, so long as their convictions and willpower in executing justice are sufficiently strong. Hong Gildong, for example, successfully wielded a fourth mahai medallion. After the fall of Jushin, both first and second mahai medallions were rendered useless; only third and fourth mahai medallions still functioned.

Amheng osa are also prohibited from having families, but they are allowed a single travel partner called a 'Sando', who doubles as a bodyguard. Sando tend to be individuals of great fighting prowess or intelligent beasts.

Characters
Munsu (文秀/문수)
The anti-heroic protagonist of the series, former military general, and a third mahai amen osa from the fallen kingdom of Jushin. Despite the common perception held by Jushin's former citizens that amen osa are virtuous and bearers of justice, Munsu usually comes across as somewhat amoral and does not believe in helping people who refuse to help themselves. When he does help others, his methods almost always involve excessive bloodshed, lying, torture, and other questionable acts.
Munsu suffers from a curse that resembles asthma, which can only be alleviated by the inhaler-like charm he wears around his neck. This curse originates from during the Jushin period, where he convinced Aji Tae to switch the curse which was originally suffered by his lover Kye Wol Hyang unto him in hopes of relieving her pain. However, this was ineffective; not only did she die in the end while he retained the curse, Munsu actually fell directly into Aji Tae's scheme. In volume 11, Munsu confessed to Wonsul that despite claims that he was her killer, the truth was that Kye Wol Hyang killed herself by running into his sword while he was holding it right into her heart. He blames himself for her death and believes that he is her killer. When asked by Hong Gildong, he refused to deny that he was her sister's killer although his life was at stake. He went against the entire Hwalbindang after consuming a special drug that removed his asthma for a period of time, and managed to kill most of them. However, the drug had negative side effects when it wore off, and conveniently Aji Tae appeared while Munsu was at his most weak and wounded moment. Seeing his sworn enemy, his condition worsened and he started vomiting more blood, falling into a more critical state. Munsu swears that he will not die despite reality and that he will find Aji Tae in the end.
Before passing out, he asks Bang Ja to use an acupuncture needle from his pocket in order to prevent his death, but as soon as Bang Ja did it, Munsu's heart stopped beating. Everyone lost hope and believed that he was dead; however, after a few days despite the humid weather, Munsu's body did not decay. Later it was discovered that the needle contained mandrake extract and Munsu was affected with the infamous hallucinogen, allowing him to escape death. But being affected by the mandrake's poison means he will forever live in a fake world of his most desired dreams where he happily living with his loved one. Volume 11 shows the most treasured moments in Munsu's life and more about his past, including his relationship with Kye Wol Hyang.
After waking up from his dream-world, Munsu realizes that the mandrake extract has cancelled out his curse and he realizes that he only has a few more days to live. Munsu calls in favors from his allies and launches a massive attack on Aji Tae's castle. Although Munsu is victorious in killing his nemesis, he succumbs to his ailments and dies. In the last chapter, Munsu is reunited with his lover and friends in the afterlife.
Sando/Chun Hyang (山道/春香/산도/춘향)
A beautiful girl with prodigious fighting skill. She acts as Munsu's 'Sando', or bodyguard. When she was kidnapped by a corrupt lord who wanted to make her his personal bodyguard, her lover embarked on a futile quest to become an amen osa. He died in the process, but not before making Munsu aware of her plight. After Munsu frees her, she decides to become his bodyguard in memory of her dead lover, and takes the title "Sando" as her new name.
Despite her fearsome natural fighting ability, Sando is quiet and shy, with a high moral stance. As a result, she is often in conflict with the amoral Munsu over his questionable methods. She has made it clear that if he ever becomes truly evil, she will no longer protect him. She also has a great fear of heights, and will refuse to cross bridges set over deep mountain gorges or valleys. Munsu finds this extremely peculiar, seeing as to how she often leaps several stories into the air during combat.
Together with Munsu and Bang Ja, Sando helps fight corruption. Although she is still hesitant about Munsu's methods, she learns to trust him, and Munsu in turn relies on her more than ever.
Later in the series, she is defeated in combat and leaves Munsu in shame to pursue greater strength. She learns the power of using her 'ki' from a friend of Aji Tae, attaining the strength she desires. She becomes devastated after she hears about the "death" of Munsu from Aji Tae and he manipulates her into becoming his latest bodyguard.
When Munsu storms the castle to kill Aji Tae, she originally fights him, chopping off one of his arms. However, Munsu is able to help her remember their memories and friendship. Together, they fight Aji Tae, and Sando is the one who kills him. When Munsu dies in the castle, Sando grieves.
After the two-month time-skip, it is revealed from Bang Ja's letters that Sando has parted ways and is still using her fighting skills to extinguish evil.
Bang Ja (房子/방자)
Munsu's unwanted but good-intentioned servant. Once the servant and apprentice of a first mahai onshi, his former master released him from service after Jushin's destruction. When his master and his sando were later killed in a rebel uprising against a corrupt lord, Bang Ja began roaming the country as a thief. He believes that amen osa should be virtuous and heroic, which is why Munsu's behavior often shocks him.
He is a third-rate Magician who summons animals to do his bidding, and he deeply takes his role as a Bang Ja seriously. This often leads to his being manipulated and bullied by Munsu, who often beats him or sends him on inane/impossible errands.
He was responsible for the main death of Won Hyo. After Sando left the group and Munsu almost died, Bang Ja used Yuui Tae's acupuncture needle on Munsu so that he lives. Bang Ja finds it difficult that Munsu is in a coma state situation that he is a lifeless body. After Yeongsil received the false information about the Mandrake cure, Bang Ja and Yeongsil traveled together to an icy mountain encountering Sando. Having joined Aji Tae, Sando attacked Bang Ja and Yeongsil. In order to save his life, Yeongsil injects Bang Ja with a drug that makes Bang Ja appear dead. Fortunately, Bang Ja recovers when he hears Munsu's voice. 
In the battle at Aji Tae's castle, Bang Ja helps Munsu create a diversion. After Aji Tae's defeat and Munsu's death, Bang Ja writes a letter to Munsu, recommitting himself to fight for the ideal world that Munsu had talked about.
Kye Wol Hyang (桂月香/계월향)
Is Munsu's deceased lover and sister of Hong Gildong. She is Munsu and Hae Mo Su's childhood friend. She has an illness that resembles asthma, which can only be alleviated by the inhaler-like charm he wears around his neck. Munsu could not stand and watch Kye Wol Hyang suffer so he asked Aji Tae to perform a ritual to pass Kye Wol Hyang's illness to Munsu. Later it is known that Kye Wol Hyang committed suicide but Munsu still blames himself for her death even when Hong Gildong asks for the truth.
Won Sul (元述/원술)
A master swordsman from Jushin, who was once a subordinate of Munsu. However, when Jushin fell he began serving Aji Tae, growing Yang Gwi Bi, a plant with narcotic properties, to ship to the west in exchange for weaponry. His weapon, Saruhyondo, is a sword with a blade forged from his killing 'ki', or killing intent. Aside from being impossibly sharp and hard, the blade is also extremely malleable, re-shaping itself into any killing form Wonsul can imagine. As it is made of pure killing ki, the blade is also invisible to the naked eye. Wonsul can manifest the blade so long as he has something to act as a hilt, such as a stick or his signature dragon's head sword hilt.
While working for Aji Tae, Wonsul was defeated and killed by Sando, while temporarily confused by her possession of Aji Tae's lucky charm. His death, however, proved temporary, as he was later resurrected by Aji Tae. Now effectively a zombie of sorts, Wonsul retained his mind and skill, but his body was like a living corpse, continuing to decay. Furthermore, his re-animated form proved extremely hard to kill, since it was already technically dead - even when decapitated, he still remained conscious and fully aware. He went on to serve as Munsu's sando in Chun Hyang's stead. When Munsu went against the Hwalbindang, Wonsul remained by his side. As their battle with the Hwalbindang comes, Aji Tae made his appearance, upon which Wonsul requested that the former end his state of living death. At first Aji Tae appears to oblige, disintegrating Wonsul's body. However, Aji Tae then states that so long as even part of his body remains intact, he wants Wonsul to remain alive, and "see everything through to the end". At this, Wonsul's head, the only remaining part of his body, begins to cry.
Later, when Munsu recovers from his mandrake-induced coma and prepares for a final battle with Aji Tae, Wonsul is dispatched to attack. Despite having been turned into an immense, grotesque mass of flesh (he is initially mistaken for one of Kaidaiten's demons), Munsu recognises his old friend and grants Wonsul his wish, exploding a nearby ammunition dump and engulfing the monstrosity in the blast. Back in his fortress, Aji Tae comments that Wonsul is finally dead.
After Munsu's death, Won Sul jokes with Munsu in the afterlife.
Aji Tae (阿志泰/아지태)
A former scholar from Jushin and the man Munsu holds responsible for the destruction of the country. Many of Munsu's former allies and comrades have since switched their loyalties to Aji Tae, having been coerced by his power or duped by his charisma. His motives and purpose remain unknown. He possesses a large range of magical abilities, among them the ability to resurrect the dead, explode people with a mere glance, shapeshifting, and teleportation.
During the Junshin period, Aji Tae was General Munsu's second-in-command. At that time, he was smaller in size and sported short black hair and glasses. Despite his innocent exterior, however, the Jushin Aji Tae was already convinced of the inferiority and unworthiness of mankind, and was already plotting his conquest of Jushin.
As of volume 15, he has succeeded in conquering most of the former Jushin territories, having gathered together a formidable force of supernatural allies. This includes the resurrected Kaidaiten and its demon brood, an army of undead, black magic practitioners from the West, and Munsu's former bodyguard Sando.

Series origins
Much of the premise for and characters of Blade of the Phantom Master were drawn from the classic Korean tale, The Legend of Chun Hyang. Youn said many Korean readers of the comic did not like his dark portrayal of the light-hearted classic tale, and he was sometimes told he had "bad taste." He explained that Blade of the Phantom Mask used the original, lesser-known version of The Legend of Chun Hyang, which is far more tragic, as its basis. He sought to not only draw on the beauty of the original novel, but also to arrange its message to fit modern times. Youn also drew upon other classic Korean stories, such as Amhaengeosa (Secret royal inspector), and historical figures like Heo Jun for inspiration.

The model for Munsu was the historical figure Park Mun-su, from Korea's Joseon Dynasty period. According to Youn, he was originally a military officer in charge of training the army, and was active as an amen osa for only one year. However, his legacy was considerable, including not only seeking and punishing corrupt officials, but also stopping the invasion of the Korean peninsula by foreigners and saving the king from a coup d'état. Sando is based largely on Ju Non-gae, a figure from the Japanese-Korean Seven-Year War. Following the capture of Hanyang (now Seoul) by Toyotomi Hideyoshi's troops in 1592, Non-gae avenged the death of her lover, a soldier, by willingly giving up her life to cause the death of a Japanese general. The holiday Uiambeolje commemorates her spirit of patriotic self-sacrifice.

When developing the idea of using a story about amen osa, Youn said he worried that Japanese readers might find the idea too foreign. He later learned that Japan had similar people, called mito koumon, in its history, and eventually found that many places around the world had individuals of similar positions in their own histories. He felt this universality of such heroes who seek out and report corrupt government officials showed that good and evil do not differentiate between countries, races, or cultures. Youn admits to being influenced his portrayal of amen osa by Richō Angyōki (李朝暗行記), a Japanese manga by Natsuki Sumeragi. While a bit embarrassed at being so affected by a foreigner's portrayal of Korean history, he was impressed and surprised by the manga's historical accuracy.

Media

Comic
The Blade of the Phantom Master comic was serialized in Japan in Shogakukan's seinen manga magazine Monthly Sunday Gene-X from March 19, 2001, to August 18, 2007. It was also published as manhwa in South Korea's Young Champ. The work was collected into 17 graphic novel volumes, which were published by Shogakukan in Japan and Daiwon C.I. in South Korea. As of 2005, these collections have sold over 2 million copies between the two countries. Translation of the comic from Korean to Japanese was provided by Manabu Okazaki. Many chapters included special author's notes to give background on Korean folktales and historical figures referenced in the story, and to explain instances in which the author chose to deviate from generally accepted fact in his portrayals. For instance, in volume 4, Youn provided information on Hwanung, a sage from the Korean legend, Dangun Shinhwa. He feared his portrayal of Hwanung as a summoned creature dressed in S&M gear might cause misunderstandings among readers of the comic, and explained that his development of the character in the comic was influenced by interesting but unsupported statements from the internet, whereas the Hwanung of legend holds a very high status in Korea, on a par with "that of Jesus Christ in Western society."

Japanese editions of the comic volumes also included omake-style humorous shorts detailing a variety of Youn and Yang's cross cultural and comic writing adventures, entitled "From Korea - Hello!!"
Youn and Yang maintained their residences in Incheon, South Korea throughout most of the writing and publication of the series, often requiring the services of translators for dealings with their Japanese editor, Akinobu Natsume, especially early on, and necessitating multiple business trips to Japan.  Youn studied Japanese and his proficiency improved as the comic progressed. He admitted, however, that it "took two hours while staring at a dictionary" to read his first Japanese-language fan letter.

Japanese editions of volume 8 of the comic were packaged with a bonus booklet entitled Osa-logy. It contained a short side story by the series authors, plus humorous comic shorts by guest authors and artists. Also included were interviews between author Youn and actress Yoon Son-ha, and between Youn and the manga authors Clamp. A guidebook entitled Amenosa, This Reality and Mission (アメンオサ、その真実と使命 Amenosa, sono shinjitsu to shimei, 공식 가이드북) was also published, containing color art galleries by artist Yang, plus story summaries and character data. A "gaiden"-style volume of two side stories was also released for sale.

Since its original releases in South Korea and Japan, the comic has been licensed and published in French as Le Nouvel Angyo Onshi by Pika Édition, in Hungarian as Árnybíró by Mangafan, in German as Shin Angyo Onshi by Carlsen Comics, in Thai as Dtòo Laa Gaan Tá-mil Chà-bàp Pí-sèt (ตุลาการทมิฬ ฉบับพิเศษ) by Vibulkij, in Indonesian as Shin Angyo Onshi by Level Comics, and in Chinese by Jonesky (Hong Kong) and Sharp Point Press (Taiwan). No English-language adaptations have been published or announced as licensed.

Animated film
In 2004, Japanese studio Oriental Light and Magic and Korean studio Character Plan collaborated to create an animated film adaptation of the comic, entitled Phantom Master: Dark Hero from the Ruined Empire. The project represented the first time Korean and Japanese creators had ever collaborated on an animated film, and funding was shared by sources from both nations. It was distributed by The Klockworx in Japan and Cinema Service in Korea. The film was co-directed by Ahn Tae-gun and Jōji Shimura, and produced by Yang Jae-hye, Lee Sang-don, Bunsho Kajiya, Lee Don-ki, and Shukuchi Kanda. It featured a musical score from composer Kow Otani and theme songs performed by BoA. Vocal tracks were recorded in both Korean and Japanese, though Korean actor Ji Sung's narration was retained in its original language for the Japanese release and augmented with native subtitles. Character Plan president Yang Jee-hye said his company was able to learn new skills and technologies, both of which have been maintained during Japan's long history of film-making, from Oriental Light and Magic, who completed about 70% of the work on the film.

Phantom Master: Dark Hero from the Ruined Empire was shown at the Sixth Bucheon International Animation Festival, 6 November 2004, in Bucheon, South Korea, at which it served as the opening film. It was released into theaters simultaneously in Japan and Korea on 26 November 2004, and had an encore run at the Seoul Ani Cinema for three weeks beginning 17 February 2005. Its North American debut was at the Fantasia Festival in Montreal, Quebec, Canada on 15 July 2005, where it was shown in Korean with English subtitles. ADV Films released the movie to DVD in North America in 2007, with a choice of Japanese or English audio and optional English subtitles. The movie has also been locally released in Poland as Ostatni Strażnik Magii by Vision Film's Anime Gate imprint and in Russia as Povelitel' Prizrakov (lit. Lord of the Ghosts) by MC Entertainment. The film was re-released on DVD by Funimation Entertainment on June 30, 2009 under the title Blade of the Phantom Master: Shin Angyo Onshi with the ADV movie trailer for the film as a special feature. The film features the English language track and the Japanese language track with English subtitles.

The film is an adaptation of early comic chapters, covering the stories of Munsu's desert encounter with Mong Ryong, his subsequent quest to free Sando, and one of the pair's early adventures together.

Webtoon
On November 18, 2017, this work is rebooted and started serializing to Naver Webtoon three times a week. Because this comic is rebooted, it reconstructed the coloring and the cut arrangement newly in the webtoon style. It is collaborating with a company named YLAB on a webtoon project called Super String.

Notes

References

External links 
 

2001 manhwa
2001 manga
2004 anime films
Animated films based on manhwa
Animated films based on manga
Action anime and manga
ADV Films
Films scored by Kow Otani
Funimation
High fantasy anime and manga
Japanese animated films
Manhwa titles
Seinen manga
South Korean animated films
South Korean webtoons
Sharp Point Press titles
Odex
OLM, Inc. animated films